Meath was a parliamentary constituency in Ireland, which from 1801 to 1885 returned two Members of Parliament (MPs) to the House of Commons of the United Kingdom.

Boundaries
This constituency comprised the whole of County Meath.

Members of Parliament

Elections

Elections in the 1830s
Taylour succeeded to the peerage, becoming 2nd Marquess of Headfort and causing a by-election.

 

 

 

Somerville's death caused a by-election.

Elections in the 1840s
O'Connell resigned after being appointed assistant registrar of deeds, causing a by-election.

 

 

Elections in the 1850s

 

Lucas' death caused a by-election.

Elections in the 1860s

Elections in the 1870s
Corbally's death caused a by-election.

 

Martin's death caused a by-election.

Elections in the 1880s

 

Parnell was also elected MP for Cork City and opted to sit there, causing a by-election.

Sullivan resigned, causing a by-election.

Davitt was disqualified because he was in prison, causing a by-election.

Metge resigned, causing a by-election.

Notes

References
The Parliaments of England by Henry Stooks Smith (1st edition published in three volumes 1844–50), 2nd edition edited (in one volume) by F.W.S. Craig (Political Reference Publications 1973)

Westminster constituencies in County Meath (historic)
Constituencies of the Parliament of the United Kingdom established in 1801
Constituencies of the Parliament of the United Kingdom disestablished in 1885